Charles County is a county in Southern Maryland. As of the 2020 census, the population was 166,617. The county seat is La Plata. The county was named for Charles Calvert (1637–1715), third Baron Baltimore. Charles County is part of the Washington metropolitan area and the Southern Maryland region. With a median household income of $103,678, it is the 39th wealthiest county in the United States and the highest-income county with a Black-majority population.

History
Charles County was created in 1658 by an Order in Council. There was also an earlier Charles County from 1650 to 1654, sometimes referred to in historic documents as Old Charles County, which consisted largely of lands within today’s borders but "included parts of St. Mary’s, Calvert, present-day Charles and Prince George’s County".

In April 1865, John Wilkes Booth made his escape through Charles County after shooting President Abraham Lincoln. He was on his way to Virginia. He stopped briefly in Waldorf (then called Beantown) and had his broken leg set by local Doctor Mudd, who was later sent to prison for helping him. Boothe then proceeded to hide in the Zekiah Swamp in Charles County, avoiding search parties for over a week until he and his accomplice were able to successfully cross the Potomac River.

In 1926, a tornado ripped through the county leaving 17 dead (including 13 schoolchildren). On April 28, 2002, another tornado (rated an F-4) destroyed much of downtown La Plata killing 3 and injuring over 100 people.

The county has numerous properties on the National Register of Historic Places. Among them are Green Park and Pleasant Hill, home of the Green and Spalding Families.

On December 4, 2004, an arson took place in the development of Hunters Brooke, a few miles southeast of Indian Head. The Hunters Brooke Arson was the largest residential arson in Maryland history.

Politics and government
Owing to the considerable voting power of its large number of freedmen following the Civil War, and later its growth as a suburban area, Charles County was for a long time solidly Republican. The only Democrat to carry Charles County until 1960 was Franklin Roosevelt in 1932, although Alf Landon and Wendell Willkie defeated Roosevelt in the next two elections by a combined margin of just 50 votes. Since the turn of the millennium, Charles County has become reliably Democratic, although not as overwhelmingly so as other parts of Maryland's Washington, D.C. suburbs. Charles County is one of only two counties in the nation to have voted for Al Gore in 2000 after voting for Bob Dole in 1996, along with Orange County, Florida.

|}

Board of Commissioners
Charles County is governed by county commissioners, the traditional form of county government in Maryland. There are five commissioners. , they are:

Charles County is entirely within the 5th Congressional District, which also includes Calvert, St. Mary's, and parts of Anne Arundel and Prince George's counties. The current representative is Democratic House Majority Leader and (former House Minority Whip) Steny H. Hoyer.

Geography

In its western wing, along the southernmost bend in Maryland Route 224, Charles County contains a place due north, east, south, and west of the same state—Virginia.

Adjacent counties

 Prince George's County (north)
 Fairfax County, Virginia (northwest)
 Calvert County (east)
 Stafford County, Virginia (west)
 Prince William County, Virginia (west)
 St. Mary's County (southeast)
 Westmoreland County, Virginia (southeast)
 King George County, Virginia (south)

National protected area
 Thomas Stone National Historic Site
Mallows Bay

Demographics

2020 census

Note: the US Census treats Hispanic/Latino as an ethnic category. This table excludes Latinos from the racial categories and assigns them to a separate category. Hispanics/Latinos can be of any race.

2010 census
As of the 2010 United States Census, there were 146,551 people, 51,214 households, and 38,614 families residing in the county. The racial makeup of the county was 50.3% white, 41.0% black or African American, 3.0% Asian, 0.7% American Indian, 0.1% Pacific islander, 1.3% from other races, and 3.7% from two or more races. Those of Hispanic or Latino origin made up 4.3% of the population. In terms of ancestry, 12.6% were German, 10.8% were Irish, 8.7% were English, 6.3% were American, and 5.1% were Italian.

Of the 51,214 households, 41.6% had children under the age of 18 living with them, 54.2% were married couples living together, 16.3% had a female householder with no husband present, 24.6% were non-families, and 19.8% of all households were made up of individuals. The average household size was 2.83 and the average family size was 3.24. The median age was 37.4 years.

The median income for a household in the county was $88,825 and the median income for a family was $98,560. Males had a median income of $62,210 versus $52,477 for females. The per capita income for the county was $35,780. About 3.7% of families and 5.2% of the population were below the poverty line, including 6.8% of those under age 18 and 4.6% of those age 65 or over.

2000 census
As of the census of 2000, there were 120,546 people, 41,668 households, and 32,292 families residing in the county. There were 43,903 housing units at an average density of 95 per square mile (37/km2). The racial makeup of the county was 68.51% White, 26.06% Black or African American, 0.75% Native American, 1.82% Asian, 0.06% Pacific Islander, 0.72% from other races, and 2.08% from two or more races.  2.26% of the population were Hispanic or Latino of any race. 11.6% were of German, 10.8% Irish, 10.2% English, 9.3% American and 5.3% Italian ancestry.

There were 41,668 households, out of which 41.10% had children under the age of 18 living with them, 58.00% were married couples living together, 14.50% had a female householder with no husband present, and 22.50% were non-families. 17.20% of all households were made up of individuals, and 5.20% had someone living alone who was 65 years of age or older.  The average household size was 2.86 and the average family size was 3.21.

In the county, the population was spread out, with 28.70% under the age of 18, 7.60% from 18 to 24, 33.20% from 25 to 44, 22.70% from 45 to 64, and 7.80% who were 65 years of age or older.  The median age was 35 years. For every 100 females, there were 95.50 males.  For every 100 females age 18 and over, there were 92.20 males.

The median income for a household in the county was $62,199, and the median income for a family was $67,602 (these figures had risen to $80,573 and $89,358 respectively as of a 2007 estimate). Males had a median income of $43,371 versus $34,231 for females. The per capita income for the county was $24,285.  About 3.70% of families and 5.50% of the population were below the poverty line, including 6.70% of those under age 18 and 8.60% of those age 65 or over.

As of 2010, the county population's racial makeup was 48.38% Non-Hispanic whites, 40.96% blacks, 0.65% Native Americans, 2.98% Asian, 0.07% Pacific Islanders, 0.17% Non-Hispanics of some other race, 3.20% Non-Hispanics reporting more than one race and 4.27% Hispanic.

Economy

Top employers
According to Charles County's 2013 Comprehensive Annual Financial Report, its top employers are:

Education

Public schools

Colleges and universities
College of Southern Maryland, in La Plata.

Transportation
Charles County is served by numerous state highways and one U.S. Highway:

Major highways

Communities

Towns
Indian Head
La Plata (county seat)
Port Tobacco Village

Census-designated places
The Census Bureau recognizes the following census-designated places in the county:

Bensville
Bryans Road
Bryantown
Cobb Island
Hughesville
Pomfret
Potomac Heights
Rock Point
Saint Charles
Waldorf

Unincorporated communities

Bel Alton
Benedict
Dentsville
Faulkner
Glymont
Grayton
Ironsides
Issue
Malcolm
Marbury
Morgantown
Mount Victoria
Nanjemoy
Newburg
Pisgah
Popes Creek
Port Tobacco
Pomonkey
Ripley
Rison
Swan Point
Welcome
White Plains

Notable people
Charles Brooke (1636-1671) English immigrant & first Southerner to graduate from Harvard College, Class of 1655; Sheriff, Calvert County 1665
Chuck Brown (1936-2012) "Godfather of Go-Go", a subgenre of funk that evolved in the D.C. area in the 1970s; lived in Brandywine
Gustavus Richard Brown (1747-1804) Edinburgh-educated doctor; served in Revolutionary War; physician to George Washington, attended his death 
George Cary (1789-1843) born near Allen’s Fresh; practiced law in Frederick; moved to Appling County, Georgia; Member, U.S. House 1823-27
Barnes Compton (1830-1898) born Port Tobacco, Princeton '51; Pres., Maryland Senate; Treasurer of Maryland; Member, U.S. House 1885-90, 91-94
James Craik (1727-1814) Scottish immigrant; Physician General of the Continental Army; friend & physician to George Washington, attended his death
Danny Gatton (1945-1994) Virtuoso guitarist; created a jazz fusion musical style he called "redneck jazz"; lived in Newburg, died by suicide
John Hanson (1721-1783) born Port Tobacco; Founding Father of United States; Signer, Articles of Confederation; President, Confederation Congress
Josiah Henson (1789-1883) born into slavery in Port Tobacco; escaped to Canada & founded community of fugitive slaves; author, abolitionist & minister
Matthew Henson (1866-1955) born in Nanjemoy; African-American explorer; first to reach North Pole in 1909, with Robert Peary & 4 Inuit companions
Daniel of St. Thomas Jenifer (1723-1790) born Port Tobacco; Founding Father of U.S.; Delegate, Constitutional Convention; Signer, U.S. Constitution 
Larry Johnson (born 1979) from Pomfret; former NFL running back; played for K.C. Chiefs, Cincinnati Bengals, Washington Redskins & Miami Dolphins
Shawn Lemon (born 1988) Attended Westlake H.S. in Waldorf; played with seven teams in the Canadian Football League as a defensive lineman
Jane Herbert Wilkinson Long (1798-1880) born Charles County; Texas Patriot & boarding-house matron; dubbed "Mother of Texas" by Sam Houston
Joel & Benji Madden (born 1979) Identical twins from Waldorf; both with bands The Madden Brothers & Good Charlotte; Benji married to Cameron Diaz
Christina Milian (born 1981) Movie & TV actress; Top 40 singer/songwriter in US (Top 4 in UK); raised in Waldorf to age 13 & part of high school
Samuel A. Mudd (1833-1883) born near Bryantown; physician imprisoned for aiding John Wilkes Booth after assassination of Pres. Abraham Lincoln
Sydney E. Mudd (1858-1911) born in Gallant Green; Speaker, Maryland House of Delegates; Member, U.S. House of Reps 1890-91, 1897-1911
Francis Neale (1756-1836) born Port Tobacco; Jesuit pastor of St. Thomas Manor & Holy Trinity, first Catholic Church in D.C., President of Georgetown
Capt. James Neale (1615-1684) born in London, immigrated around 1635; Member, Maryland Council; founded Wollaston Manor & Cobb Island
Leonard Neale (1746-1817) born Port Tobacco; Jesuit President of Georgetown; Archbishop of Baltimore; first U.S.-consecrated Catholic prelate (1800)
Raphael Semmes (1809-1877) born near Nanjemoy; US Navy officer; Captain, CSS Sumter & CSS Alabama; Rear Admiral, Confederate States Navy
William Smallwood (1732-1792) Officer, Provincial Troops; Major General, 1st Maryland Regiment of the Continental Army; Governor of Maryland
Randy Starks (born 1983) Attended Westlake in Waldorf; played NFL as a defensive end with Tennessee Titans, Miami Dolphins & Cleveland Browns
Robert Stethem (1961-1985) U.S. Navy diver; murdered in Beirut during hijacking of TWA Flight 847; grew up in Pinefield community of Waldorf
Benjamin Stoddert (1751-1813) Captain of Cavalry in the Continental Army; first U.S. Secretary of the Navy in the John Adams administration
Thomas Stone (1743-1787) born at Poynton Manor near Port Tobacco; Founding Father of the United States; Signer, U.S. Declaration of Independence
Turkey Tayac (1895-1978) born Charles County; Chief, one branch of Piscataway Indian Nation; WWI veteran; Medicine Man & Native American activist
Andrew White (1579-1656) born in London; Jesuit with first colonists arriving on Ark & Dove; established mission to the Potapoco at Chapel Point (1641)
Angela Renée White a.k.a. "Blac Chyna" (born 1988) Model, socialite & television personality; attended Henry E. Lackey High School in Indian Head

Sports

See also

Carpenter Point, Charles County, Maryland
National Register of Historic Places listings in Charles County, Maryland

References

External links

Charles County Commissioners' Office

Hamilton Family papers, at the University of Maryland libraries. A prominent Charles County family with records from 1803 to 1923.
Paul Dennis Brown Family papers, at the University of Maryland libraries. A prominent Charles County family with records from 1879 to 1973. Documents civil engagement, agriculture, and history of life in Charles County.

 

 
Maryland counties
Maryland counties on the Potomac River
Washington metropolitan area
1658 establishments in Maryland
Populated places established in 1658
Majority-minority counties and independent cities in Maryland